Sweyn Godwinson ( 1020 – 1052), also spelled Swein, was the eldest son of Earl Godwin of Wessex, and brother of Harold II of England.

Early life
In 1043 Sweyn was raised to an earldom which included Gloucestershire, Herefordshire, Oxfordshire, Berkshire, and Somerset. He signed his first Royal charter in 1044.

There is some evidence suggesting that Sweyn claimed to be a son of King Canute, but his mother indignantly denied this and brought forth witnesses to his parentage.

Focus on Wales
From the start, Sweyn sought peace with Gruffydd ap Llywelyn, the King of Gwynedd in northern Wales. This allowed the King of Gwynedd to gain the upper hand on Gruffydd ap Rhydderch, King of Deheubarth and his main Welsh rival. Sweyn supported the King of Gwynedd with more than words of alliance. In 1046, he joined in on an invasion of Deheubarth.

Exile
On his return from this campaign Sweyn abducted Eadgifu, the Abbess of Leominster, apparently intending to marry her and gain control of Leominster's vast estate. However, King Edward refused permission and Eadgifu returned to her abbey. Late in 1047 Sweyn left England to take refuge with Baldwin V, Count of Flanders.

During his exile he travelled first to Flanders, then to Denmark before returning to England in 1049 to beg for forgiveness. He appears to have been expelled from Denmark for an unspecified offence. His brother Harold and cousin Beorn first opposed Sweyn's return, but Beorn eventually agreed to support him.

While accompanying his cousin to meet the King, Sweyn had his cousin Beorn murdered and was again exiled, condemned as a niðing, a man of no honour.

Pardoned and restored
It appears that Sweyn was pardoned, despite his crimes, the following year (1050), and restored to his office. Some say it was his father Earl Godwin who pleaded his case to the King, others that it was Aldred or Ealdred, Bishop of Worcester, who met him in Flanders returning from his pilgrimage. In any case, his last stay in England would not be long.

Exile for life
In 1051, Earl Godwin and all his sons were exiled from England following a dispute with the King. Sweyn received the sternest judgement of them all, and was exiled for life. Again, he travelled to Flanders – this time never to return.

Killed on return from pilgrimage
It appears he was driven by remorse for his sins, as he undertook a barefoot pilgrimage to Jerusalem. It was on his return from there he was killed, although the sources differ on where.

Sweyn had one son, Hakon, said to have been a hostage in Normandy until brought back by Harold in 1064, but nothing more is known of him.

The exile and eventual death of Sweyn left Harold as the heir apparent of the Godwinson family.

Family trees
Cnut the Great's family tree

Notes

References

Sources

External links
 

House of Godwin
Anglo-Norse people
Anglo-Saxon people
Earls of Herefordshire
11th-century English people
1020s births
1052 deaths
Year of birth uncertain